Granerud is a surname. Notable people with the surname include:

Halvor Egner Granerud (born 1996), Norwegian ski jumper
Terje Granerud (born 1951), Norwegian politician